Osvaldo Licini (22 March 1894 – 11 October 1958) was an Italian painter, active as an abstract artist.

Osvaldo was born in Ascoli Piceno in the Marche. Osvaldo became an abstract artist around 1930 after his encounter with the Parisian Circle et Carré and Abstraction-Création groups. In 1986, the Centro Studi Osvaldo Licini was founded in his adopted town of Monte Vidon Corrado where he died in 1958.

References

1894 births
1958 deaths
20th-century Italian painters
Italian male painters
Painters from Parma
Abstract painters
20th-century Italian male artists